Rowing at the 2013 Canada Summer Games was in Sherbrooke, Quebec at Lake Magog.  It was held from the 13 to 17 August.  There were 14 events of rowing.

Medal table
The following is the medal table for rowing at the 2013 Canada Summer Games.

Rowing

Women's

References

External links 

2013 Canada Summer Games
Canada Summer Games
Canada Summer Games